The Legend of Mir may refer to:

The Legend of Mir 2
The Legend of Mir 3

See also
 Mir (disambiguation)